The discography of the Japanese idol group Candies consists of 11 studio albums, 24 compilation albums, and 18 singles released since 1973.

Albums

Studio albums

Live albums

Compilations

Box sets

Singles

Footnotes

References

External links 
 

Discographies of Japanese artists
Pop music discographies